The Monument Indië-Nederland is located near the Olympiaplein in the southern part of Amsterdam. The monument was originally a memorial for General J. B. van Heutsz, who was the commandant of the Royal Netherlands East Indies Army and is also known for conquering Aceh for the Kingdom of the Netherlands in 1903 following the Aceh War. Because of political pressure the name was in 2004 changed to Monument Indië-Nederland.

The origin
After his death in 1924, a mausoleum was founded for Van Heutsz on the Nieuwe Oosterbegraafplaats. At the time the mausoleum was completed, there was still a bit of the collected money left. After the government agreed with the idea in 1930 to build a monument with this money in another part of Amsterdam, they started a contest. This contest was won by the architect  and the sculptor Frits van Hall. Although there were strong protests of communists and social democrats, the monument was unveiled by Queen Wilhelmina, in the presence of princess Juliana and prime minister Colijn in 1935. The monument consists of a female character with a lion on each side. This was all surrounded by a pond and a stone wall.

Symbolism
Almost every part of the monument symbolizes the relations between the Netherlands and Indonesia. The female character in the center with the scroll of law in her hand, represents the Dutch authority in Indonesia. On each side of her is a lion, who both symbolize a city. One of them stands for Batavia, the old name of the capital of the Dutch East Indies, the other one stands for Amsterdam. In popular speech the woman is also called Mien met de hondjes ( Mien with the dogs in English) or de Nederlandse maagd (the Dutch virgin).

On the pedestal used to be a portrait of general van Heutsz, but because there was a lot of criticism about how van Heutsz had beaten down rebellions in Aceh, the portrait was removed and the name of the monument was changed from het van Heutsz monument to het monument Indië-Nederland. After the plaquette with the portrait had been removed, it was stolen in 1984.

The pond symbolizes the water that separates the Netherlands and Indonesia. On the walls with the arcs on the left and on the right of the statue are placed reliefs that represent the islands of the archipelago.

Attacks and protests
Since 1935 the monument is frequently damaged. Already twice the monument has been the target of a bomb attack, in 1967 and in 1984. One remarkable fact is that van Heutsz Junior protested against the monument of his father in 1943 because in his opinion the monument was too weak. After the attack in 1984 and the theft of the portrait of van Heutsz the peace returned around the monument, until 1997, when the government wanted to renovate the monument. The protests came back on and the government decided to only sand blast the monument.

Changes after the unveiling
Since the monument was unveiled, a few changes have been made to it. In 2004 the proposal to contribute the monument to Multatuli was rejected and it became a memorial that shows the relations between Indonesia and the Netherlands. That the monument became a memorial became clear in 2007 when a few changes were made:
 Brick pedestals were added to the monument. The difference between the eastern (Indonesia) and the western (Netherlands) part of the monument were expressed by the different colors.
 Six different dates were added to the monument:
 1596, the landing of Cornelis de Houtman and Pieter Dirkszoon Keyser at Banten
 1935, the unveiling of the statue
 1945, the Proclamation of Indonesian Independence
 1949, Dutch recognition of Indonesian independence
 2001, change of function and name
 2007, expansion of the monument

References

External links
 Van Heutsz-monument at buitenbeeldinbeeld.nl

Buildings and structures in Amsterdam
Monuments and memorials in the Netherlands
Dutch East Indies